BK Barons/LDz (previously Barons/LMT) was a professional basketball club which is based in Riga, Latvia. The team played in the first division of Latvian Basketball League.

History
Barons kvartāls was an integral part of Latvia's recent basketball history, as it (under the name Princips) was one of the foundation teams of the Latvian Basketball League (LBL) in 1992. In the first season Princips carried off bronze in the LBL. After two seasons Princips was renamed the LainERS, making their way into Latvia's basketball history with its first American legionary Mikki Jackson, with a cheerleader show and first ever game programmes in the Latvian league.

LainERS achieved LBL bronze in 1994, and in the next two seasons finished in 4th place. They also reached the semi-finals in 1998, but then for couple of years no greater success was achieved.

The club's revival started in the fall 2001, when LainERS became Barons. The road up was made little by little, but permanent. On the year 2004 Barons took LBL bronze, but on the next two years the historical 2nd place was achieved. Barons made history again with first players cards. In January 2007 came out already third issue of the fan beloved cards. In the last season on the LBL Barons/O!Karte in semi-finals in series of five games lost to the next Latvian champions ASK Rīga, but in the fight for the bronze won Liepājas Lauvas.

Barons/O!Karte has participated in all three of the Baltic Basketball League championships. So far the highest achievement was on the year 2006, when Barons/O!Karte participated in the Final Six  in Tallinn. On 15 October 2006, the audience for the Barons/O!Karte game with Kauņas Žalgiris was a record high – 11,500 spectators.

2008 season Barons/O!Karte got to Baltic Basketball League eighth-final, where in the best out of two games lost to Kalev/Cramo. But still the season can be considered as a historical, because for the first time Barons won Latvian championships and FIBA EuroCup.

Latvian championships was won again by Barons in 2010.

Season 2011–12 Barons played in Latvian Basketball League 2nd division (LBL2), where ranked first place and in next season came back to LBL with name Barons Kvartāls.

In September 2017 the club announced not to participate in LBL due financial reason.

Roster

Season by season

Notable players

 Kaspars Bērziņš
 Armands Šķēle
 Kristaps Valters
 Ernests Kalve
 Gatis Jahovičs
 Giedrius Gustas
 Dainius Adomaitis
 Dovydas Redikas
 Mikki Jackson
 Kebu Stewart
 Demetrius Alexander
 Dontell Jefferson
 Tyler Cain
  Jamar Anthony Diggs

Championships
Latvian Championships: 2 (2008, 2010)
FIBA EuroCup: 1 (2008)

References

External links
Official website

Basketball teams in Latvia
Sport in Riga
Basketball teams established in 2000
2000 establishments in Latvia